Soi Cowboy is a 2008 Thai drama film directed by British director Thomas Clay. The film stars Nicolas Bro as a Danish expatriate living in Bangkok and Pimwalee Thampanyasan as his Thai girlfriend. Soi Cowboy was first shown at the 2008 Cannes Film Festival in Un Certain Regard.

Plot
Overweight expatriate Tobias shares his Bangkok apartment with his pregnant Thai girlfriend Koi. They have so little in common that their relationship is conducted in near silence though they tolerate each other for reasons of security and companionship. Their lives are uneventful and dull until a provincial mafia hitman arrives on the scene.

Cast
 Nicolas Bro         -   Tobias Christiansen
Art Supawatt Purdy  -  As Himself
  Pimwalee Thampanyasan  -   Koi
  Petch Mekoh            -   Cha
  Natee Srimanta         -   Koi's friend
  Somluck Kamsing        -   Uncle

References

External links
 
 
 De Warrenne Pictures Website

2008 films
Thai drama films
Thai-language films
Films shot in Thailand